Weroth is an Ortsgemeinde – a community belonging to a Verbandsgemeinde – in the Westerwaldkreis in Rhineland-Palatinate, Germany.

Geography

Location
The community lies in the Westerwald between Montabaur and Limburg an der Lahn. Weroth lies 290 m above sea level. It belongs to the Verbandsgemeinde of Wallmerod, a kind of collective municipality. Its seat is in the like-named town.

Neighbouring communities
Weroth's neighbours are Hundsangen, Wallmerod, Dreikirchen and Steinefrenz.

History
In 1322, Weroth had its first documentary mention.

Politics

The municipal council is made up of 11 council members who were elected in a majority vote in a municipal election on 13 June 2004.

Economy and infrastructure

Right nearby to the community's north runs Bundesstraße 8, leading from Limburg an der Lahn to Hennef. The nearest Autobahn interchange is Diez on the A 3 (Cologne–Frankfurt), some 4 km away. The nearest InterCityExpress stop is the railway station at Montabaur on the Cologne-Frankfurt high-speed rail line.

Regular events
Saint Sebastian’s Day on 20 January is to this day still a holiday in Weroth, as the community was spared a Plague epidemic.

Likewise held every year is the Live-Rock-Festival at the Bürgerhaus on Kirmesfreitag (“Kermis Friday”)

References

External links
  

Municipalities in Rhineland-Palatinate
Westerwaldkreis